Zoltán Csontos (born 30 May 1986) is a Hungarian football player who currently plays for Soproni VSE.

Honours
Hungarian Second Division:  Winner: 2008

References
HLSZ

1986 births
Living people
People from Sopron
Hungarian footballers
Association football defenders
FC Sopron players
Szombathelyi Haladás footballers
Sportspeople from Győr-Moson-Sopron County